Charles Ainslie Crichton (6 August 1910 – 14 September 1999) was an English film director and editor. 

Born in Wallasey, Cheshire, he became best known for directing many comedies produced at Ealing Studios and had a 40-year career editing and directing many films and television programmes. For his final film, the acclaimed comedy A Fish Called Wanda (1988), Crichton was nominated for both the Academy Award for Best Director and the Academy Award for Best Original Screenplay (along with the film's star John Cleese).

Early life and education
Crichton, one of six siblings, was born on 6 August 1910 in Wallasey, Cheshire, England. He was educated at Oundle School in Northamptonshire, followed by New College at the University of Oxford where he read History.

Career

Editing
In 1931, Crichton began his career in the film industry as a film editor. His first credit as editor was Men of Tomorrow (1932). He edited over fifty films, such as Things to Come (1936). Other films he edited included those that were produced by Alexander Korda, such as Cash (1933), The Girl from Maxim's (1933), The Private Life of Henry VIII (1933), Sanders of the River (1935), Elephant Boy (1937) and The Thief of Bagdad (1940). Crichton was paid £8 per week for his editing. In 1940, Crichton began his employment at Ealing Studios. There he edited the film, The Big Blockade (1942). Crichton also served as an associate producer of the film, Nine Men (1943), which he also edited.

Directing
Crichton made his directorial debut with For Those in Peril (1944). In 1945, he directed Painted Boats and co-directed a segment in Dead of Night. Crichton then directed Hue and Cry (1947), a film considered to be the first comedy released by Ealing Studios. Crichton later directed Against the Wind (1948) and Dance Hall (1950). Crichton then directed Alec Guinness in The Lavender Hill Mob (1951). This was followed by Hunted (1952), starring Dirk Bogarde. Afterwards, Crichton directed The Titfield Thunderbolt (1953). Later films he directed during the 1950s included The Divided Heart (1954), Law and Disorder (1958), and Floods of Fear (1959). He also directed Peter Sellers in The Battle of the Sexes (1959).

Crichton was the original director of Birdman of Alcatraz (1962), but he quit after clashing with Burt Lancaster.  Crichton was then replaced by John Frankenheimer. Crichton said of the experience: "Had I known that Burt Lancaster was to be de facto producer, I do not think I would have accepted the assignment, as he had a reputation for quarreling with better directors than I. But Harold Hecht, the credited producer, had assured me that there would be no interference from Lancaster. This did not prove to be the case." Crichton was also planning another film project with Sammy Davis, Jr., but it never came to fruition due to the death of a producer involved with it.

The Third Secret (1964) and He Who Rides a Tiger (1965), the last two films Crichton directed during the 1960s, were not successful. The latter film was the last film he directed for 23 years.

Crichton moved to directing television shows, then corporate videos. The latter were through John Cleese's company Video Arts. This led Cleese to propose Crichton returning to the crime comedy film genre. Beginning in 1983, Cleese and Crichton worked together on the story for A Fish Called Wanda. Cleese wrote the screenplay. When the film went into production in 1987, Cleese had to act as stand-by director for insurance reasons since Crichton was 77 years old. Cleese said of working with Crichton as a stand-by director: "That was a subterfuge.  I knew the studio would be worried about Charlie's age.  I don't know anything about how to direct, but that doesn't stop one-half of the directors.  I simply prayed that Charlie would be on the set every morning.  He shoots in such a way to convey the essence of every scene.  He's economical.  He's a dear man who's terrified of showing off.  If he says anything shrewd or insightful, he'll apologize for a minute so he won't be considered pompous."

Personal life and death 
In 1936, Crichton married Vera Harman-Mills, and together they had two sons, David and Nicholas. Nicholas became an eminent judge and reformer in UK family law. Crichton married his second wife, Nadine Haze, in 1962, and their marriage lasted until his death.

Following completion of production on A Fish Called Wanda, Crichton retired from the entertainment industry and spent the rest of his life living comfortably, fishing in both Scotland and Wales. He died on 14 September 1999 in South Kensington, London, at the age of 89.

Filmography

Feature films

Television

Danger Man
Man in a Suitcase
The Avengers (five episodes)
The Adventures of Black Beauty
Space: 1999

The Professionals
The Adventurer
Strange Report
Dick Turpin

References

External links

BECTU interview of Crichton conducted by Sid Cole and Alan Lawton (1987) reproduced on the BFI screenonline website

1910 births
1999 deaths
BAFTA Outstanding British Contribution to Cinema Award
English film directors
English film editors
People from Wallasey
People educated at Oundle School